Finningley railway station was a railway station built to serve the villages of Finningley and Blaxton, South Yorkshire, England.

History 

Although the station closed to passengers on 11 September 1961 it was opened specially for trains from Doncaster to the Finningley Air Show  until 1965 and on one occasion to serve the Royal Train when H.M. The Queen visited the Royal Air Force airfield.

Nowadays only the derelict platforms remain, along with the former station buildings (which are a private residence) and the signal box, which remains in use to operate the adjacent level crossing.

Future 
Planning permission for a new station further north to serve the airport was granted by Doncaster Council in 2008 and discussions regarding station design and service levels took place between the local authority, Network Rail and the various TOCs with a view to opening the new station in 2012. However, there was no progress on building a new station by June 2016. A 2012 report by Network Rail stated that more trains on the line would be required to make the station viable. The service over the line was sparse, with just five Doncaster to Lincoln Central  trains each way from Monday to Saturday in the May 2017 timetable.  There has been a call from Sheffield Chamber of Commerce to provide a rail link to the Doncaster Sheffield airport and a new railway station for the air terminal.

The council applied for the station in the New Stations Fund 2 in 2017 but was unsuccessful.

References

Disused railway stations in Doncaster
Former Great Northern and Great Eastern Joint Railway stations
Railway stations in Great Britain opened in 1867
Railway stations in Great Britain closed in 1961